Beech Grove City Schools is the public school district serving the city of Beech Grove, Indiana.  The district has five schools, with a total of 2,293 students. The district superintendent is Dr. Paul Kaiser.

Schools

Hornet Park Elementary
Central Elementary
South Grove Intermediate
Beech Grove Middle School
Beech Grove High School

References

School districts in Indiana
Education in Marion County, Indiana